The singles tournament of the 1989 Taipei Women's Championship was a 32-draw single elimination tournament.

Stephanie Rehe was the defending champion but did not compete that year.

Anne Minter won in the final 6–1, 4–6, 6–2 against Cammy MacGregor.

Seeds
A champion seed is indicated in bold text while text in italics indicates the round in which that seed was eliminated.

  Anne Minter (champion)
  Belinda Cordwell (first round)
  Ann Henricksson (first round)
  Betsy Nagelsen (quarterfinals)
  Beth Herr (quarterfinals)
  Julie Richardson (first round)
  Louise Field (second round)
  Ann Devries (second round)

Draw

External links
 1989 Taipei Women's Championship draw sheet at ITFTennis.com

1989 Singles
Singles
 Taipei Women's Championship - Singles, 1989